Ragged & Dirty is the second solo album by Devon Allman, released in October, 2014. The core lineup consisted of Felton Crews (bass), Giles Cory (guitar), Tom Hambridge (drums) and Marty Sammon (keyboards). Additional artists included Bobby Schneck Jr. (guitar & background vocals) and Wendy Moten (background vocals).

Recording, production 
Ragged & Dirty was recorded at Joyride Studios in Chicago and mixed & mastered at the Switchyard Studios in Nashville. It was produced, mixed and mastered by Tom Hambridge.

Track listing

Personnel
 Devon Allman - guitars, vocals
 Felton Crews - bass
 Giles Cory - guitar
 Tom Hambridge - drums, background vocals, tambourine, xylophone (track 12)
 Marty Sammon - B3 organ, piano, wurlitzer (track 4)
Additional artists
 Bobby Schneck Jr. - lead guitar (track 3), background vocals (tracks 7 & 10)
 Wendy Moten - background vocals (tracks 4 & 9)

Charts 
Ragged & Dirty debuted and peaked at #4 on Billboard's Blues Albums the week of November 1, 2014.

References

External links 
 Devon Allman Band

2014 albums
Devon Allman albums
Blues rock albums by American artists
Albums produced by Tom Hambridge